GTV (formerly known as QTV, Q and GMA News TV) is a commercial broadcast television network in the Philippines owned by Citynet Network Marketing and Production Inc, a subsidiary of GMA Network Inc. The following is a list of all television programming that GTV is currently broadcasting since it began its television operations in 2021.

For the former programming of the network and defunct networks QTV, Q and GMA News TV; see List of programs previously broadcast by QTV, Q, GMA News TV and GTV.

Current original programming

Note: Titles are listed in alphabetical order followed by the year it debuted in parentheses.

News
 Balitanghali 
 Dobol B TV 
 News Live 
 Regional TV News 
 State of the Nation

Documentary / magazine
 Biyahe ni Drew 
 Brigada 
 Good News Kasama si Vicky Morales 
 iJuander 
 Reporter's Notebook

Informative
 Dapat Alam Mo! 
 Farm to Table 
 Konsyumer at Iba Pa! 
 Oh My Job! 
 Pinas Sarap

Health
 Pinoy M.D. sa Dobol B

Sports
 NCAA Philippines

Film presentation
 Afternoon Movie Break 
 Regal Treasures 
 Viva Movie Classics 
 G! Flicks 
 Siesta Fiesta Movies

Current acquired programming
Note: Titles are listed in alphabetical order followed by the year of debut in parentheses.

Animated
 Ghost Fighter 
 Hunter × Hunter 
 Jackie Chan Adventures 
 Slam Dunk 
 Yo-kai Watch 

Drama
 Boy For Rent 
 Delayed Justice 
 Flames of Vengeance 
 Hogu's Love 
 Room No. 9 

Religious
 In Touch with Dr. Charles Stanley
 The Key of David

References

External links
 

GTV